The Last Fishing Boat is a 2012 Malawian drama film written, directed and produced by Shemu Joyah. The film stars Hope Chisanu, Flora Suya, Robert Loughlin in the lead roles. The plot of the film is based on the cultural differences between traditional African values and modernisation. The film won the Best Soundtrack Award at the 9th Africa Movie Academy Awards. The film was screened at the 2014 New African Films Festival.

Synopsis 
Once a successful fisherman (Hope Chisanu) at present find himself into extreme difficulties while his cultural aspects and values are being threatened by the rapid expansion of the tourism sector in Malawi. Things change upside down as his son (Robert Kalua) in contrast has become a tourist guide. In addition to this frustration, his third wife (Flora Suya) breaches the loyalty by engaging in sexual relationship with another man called Richard (Robert Loughlin) who is a white tourist. Richard is ready to pay large sums of money to her in order to sleep with her in the bed.

Cast 

 Hope Chisanu as fisherman
 Robert Kalua as fisherman's son
 Flora Suya as fisherman's wife
 Robert Mcloughlin as David, white tourist
 Marian Kunonga

Production 
The project marked Shemu Joyah's second directorial venture after Seasons of a Life (2009). The principal photography of the film began in 2012 and was predominantly shot on the shores of the Lake Malawi in Mangochi.

Awards and nominations 
The film received a total of five nominations at the 2013 Africa Movie Academy Awards and won the Best Soundtrack award. The film also won the Best Narrative Award at the 2013 Silicon Valley African Film Festival.

References 

2012 films
Malawian drama films
2012 drama films
Films shot in Malawi
2010s English-language films